The Colorado Women's Prison is located at 201 N. 1st St. in Canon City, Colorado. The prison was built in 1934. It was listed on the National Register of Historic Places in 1999. It is now a museum. It was listed on the National Register of Historic Places in 1999.

Architecture: Late 19th And 20th Century Revivals

See also
Colorado Territorial Prison Museum

References

CO
National Register of Historic Places in Fremont County, Colorado
Buildings and structures completed in 1934
1934 establishments in Colorado